South Carolina Highway 513 (SC 513) is a  state highway in the U.S. state of South Carolina. The highway travels through rural areas of Georgetown County.

Route description
SC 513 begins at an intersection with SC 41/SC 51 (County Line Road) south-southwest of Hopewell, on the Williamsburg–Georgetown county line. It travels to the north-northeast, on the county line, and nearly immediately intersects the eastern terminus of SC 512 (Henry Road). The highway turns right onto Pleasant Hill Drive and travels to the east into Georgetown County proper. It curves to the northeast before crossing over Browns Branch. It curves to the east and east-southeast and meets its northern terminus, an intersection with SC 261 (Pleasant Hill Drive/Choppee Road) just north of Carters Crossroads.

Major intersections

See also

References

External links

SC 513 at Virginia Highways' South Carolina Highways Annex

513
Transportation in Georgetown County, South Carolina